Crab mentality, also known as crab theory, crabs in a bucket mentality, or the crab-bucket effect, is a way of thinking best described by the phrase "if I can't have it, neither can you". 

The metaphor is derived from anecdotal claims about the behavior of crabs when they are trapped in a bucket: while any one crab can easily start to climb out, it will nonetheless be pulled back in by the others, ensuring the group's collective demise. 

The analogous theory in human behavior is that members of a group will attempt to reduce the self-confidence of any member who achieves success beyond the others, out of envy, jealousy, resentment, spite, conspiracy, or competitive feelings, to halt their progress. The same claims about behaviour are embodied in the phrase tall poppy syndrome.

Note

See also

References

Further reading

Competition
Cultural anthropology
Metaphors referring to animals
Non-cooperative games
Social psychology concepts
Crabs in culture